The Austrian Tourist Club or ÖTK is the second oldest and third largest  Alpine club in Austria.

The foundation of the club goes back to an initiative by Gustav Jäger, publisher of Der Tourist, the first tourist magazine in Austria. In contrast with the Austrian Alpine Club founded in 1862, Jäger aimed first and foremost to support nature in his local area and the states of Vienna and Lower Austria.

Sources 
 Rudl Klose: Einhundert Jahre Österreichischer Touristenklub 1869–1969. Österreichischer Touristenklub, Vienna, 1969 
 Otto W. Steiner: Österreichischer Touristenklub. 100 Jahre Österreichischer Touristenklub, 1869–1969. Vienna, 1969

References

External links 

 Website of the Austrian Tourist Club  (Österreichischer Touristenklub) 

Austrian Tourist Club
Tourist Club
1869 establishments in Austria